Gliese 514, also known as BD+11 2576 or HIP 65859, is a M-type main-sequence star, in the constellation Virgo 24.85 light-years away from the Sun. The proximity of Gliese 514 to the Sun was known exactly since 1988.

Gliese 514's metallicity Fe/H index is largely unknown, with median values from -0.4 to +0.18 reported in the literature. This discrepancy is due to peculiarities of the stellar spectrum of Gliese 514. The spectrum peculiarities also affect the accuracy of the star's temperature measurement, with reported values as low as 2901 K. The spectrum of Gliese 514 shows emission lines, but the star itself has a low starspot activity.

Multiplicity surveys did not detect any stellar companions as of 2020.

The Sun is currently calculated to be passing through the tidal tail of Gliese 514`s Oort cloud. Thus, future interstellar objects passing through Solar system may originate from Gliese 514.

Planetary system
The existence of a planet on a 15-day orbit around Gliese 514 was suspected since 2019. However, that planet was not confirmed. Instead, in 2022, one Super-Earth planet, named Gliese 514 b, was discovered on an eccentric 140-day orbit by the radial velocity method. The planetary orbit partially lies within the habitable zone of the parent star with planetary equilibrium temperature, averaged along orbit, equal to  K.

The infrared excess of the star also indicates the possible presence of a debris disk in the system, albeit at a low signal to noise ratio.

References

Virgo (constellation)
M-type main-sequence stars
Planetary systems with one confirmed planet
J13295979+1022376
BD+11 2576
065859
0514
High-proper-motion stars
Emission-line stars